Martim Afonso Chichorro (1250–1313) was a Portuguese nobleman, who served in the Court of Denis of Portugal (his half brother).

Biography 
Born in Portugal, Martim was the illegitimate son of Afonso III of Portugal and Madragana.  He was married to Inês Lourenço de Valadares (or de Sousa), daughter of Lourenço Soares de Valadares.

Martim Afonso Chichorro held various political positions in the Kingdom of Portugal, including as Governor of the city of Chaves.

References

External links 
ler.letras.up.pt

1250 births
1313 deaths
13th-century Portuguese people
14th-century Portuguese people
Medieval Portuguese nobility